Caluso is a comune (municipality) in the Metropolitan City of Turin in the Italian region Piedmont, located about  northeast of Turin.  
 
Caluso borders the following municipalities: San Giorgio Canavese, Candia Canavese, Barone Canavese, Mazzè, Foglizzo, Montanaro, and Chivasso.

The peculiar geographical position and the particular climate of the area favor the production of white wines, most notably the "Erbaluce di Caluso" and the "Caluso Passito". The town is the seat of the Regional Wine Cellar of the Province of Turin and of the State Professional Institute for Agriculture and the Environment "Carlo Ubertini".

Twin towns — sister cities
Caluso is twinned with:

  Brissac-Quincé, France

References

External links
 www.localport.it/caluso_online/home/hp_calusonline.asp

Cities and towns in Piedmont
Canavese